Sphaeroderma is a large genus of flea beetles in the family Chrysomelidae, with some 250 species from the Old World.

Selected species
Sphaeroderma epilachnoides (Wollaston, 1867)
Sphaeroderma freyi Bechyné, 1955
Sphaeroderma rubidum Graëlls, 1858
Sphaeroderma splendens (Gressitt & Kimoto, 1963)
Sphaeroderma testaceum (Fabricius, 1775)

Gallery

References

Alticini
Chrysomelidae genera
Taxa named by James Francis Stephens